Gudivada mandal is one of the 25 mandals in Krishna district of the state of Andhra Pradesh in India. It is under the administration of Gudivada revenue division and the headquarters are located at Gudivada town. The mandal is bounded by Pedaparupudi, Nandivada, Mandavalli, Mudinepalle, Gudlavalleru, Pamarru mandals of Krishna district.

Demographics 

 census, the mandal had a population of 161,453. The total population constitute, 80,752 males and 80,701 females —a sex ratio of 999 females per 1000 males. 14,932 children are in the age group of 0–6 years, of which 7,651 are boys and 7,281 are girls. The average literacy rate stands at 79.55% with 116,556 literates.

Administration 
The mandal is partially a part of the Andhra Pradesh Capital Region under the jurisdiction of APCRDA.

Towns and villages 

 census, the mandal has 30 settlements. It includes 1 town and 29 villages. The settlements in the mandal are listed below:

Note: †–Mandal Headquarters, M-Municipality

See also 
List of villages in Krishna district

References

External links

Mandals in Krishna district